{|

{{Infobox ship characteristics
|Hide header=
|Header caption=
|Ship class=
|Ship displacement=*2 966 tonnes
5 260 tonnes fully loaded
|Ship length= (172 French feet)
|Ship beam= (44' 6)
|Ship draught= (22 French feet)
|Ship propulsion=Up to 2 485 m² of sails
|Ship speed=
|Ship range=
|Ship endurance=
|Ship test depth=
|Ship boats=
|Ship capacity=
|Ship complement=678 men
|Ship armament=*74 guns:
Lower gundeck: 28 × 36-pounder long guns
Upper gundeck: 30 × 24-pounder long guns
Forecastle and Quarter deck:
16 × 8-pounder long guns
4 × 36-pounder carronades
|Ship armour=Timber
|Ship motto=
|Ship nickname=
|Ship honours=
|Ship notes=
|Ship badge=
}}
|}
The Pacificateur was a  74-gun ship of the line of the French Navy.

 Career Pacificateur'' was started at Brest in May 1801, under the supervision of engineer Antoine Geoffroy and after plans by Sané. In 1804, recurrent difficulties in bringing construction timber to Brest, compounded by a criminal fire at the arsenal in February, led Bonaparte to order all construction ceased there.

Notes

Citations

References
 

Ships of the line of the French Navy
Téméraire-class ships of the line